Death to Traitors is the second studio album by the American grunge band Paw. It was released in 1995 through A&M Records. While the album received favorable reviews from the press, sales quickly fizzled due to a lack of promotional support from the band's label. Paw was dropped by A&M in 1996, before their contract was fulfilled.

Singles from the album include "Hope I Die Tonight," "Seasoned Glove," "Max the Silent," and the five-track promotional EP "Traitors and Covers."

Track listing
"No Such Luck" – 4:25
"Seasoned Glove" – 3:58
"Hope I Die Tonight" – 4:48
"Swollen" – 3:00
"Last One" (G. Fitch, P. Fitch) – 3:49
"Death to Traitors" – 4:45
"Built Low" – 5:52
"Glue Mouth Kid" – 3:39
"Texas" – 3:29
"Max the Silent" – 3:52
"Sweet Sally Brown" (G. Fitch, P. Fitch, Mark Hennessy, John Licardello) – 5:50
"Badger" – 4:28
"Peach" (G. Fitch, P. Fitch) – 2:28
"Sunflower" – 4:02

UK version

15."Cowpoke"  - 4:22

Vinyl Version

15. "I Know Where You Sleep" - 4:35

All songs were written by Mark Hennessy, Grant Fitch, and Peter Fitch, except where noted.

Personnel
Mark Hennessy - Vocals
Paul Boblett - Bass
Grant Fitch - Guitars, Lap Steel, Vocals, Additional Bass
Peter Fitch - Drums, Percussion
John Licardello - Additional Bass

References

1995 albums
Paw (band) albums
A&M Records albums